Cymbosema is a genus of flowering plants in the legume family, Fabaceae. It belongs to the subfamily Faboideae. It may be synonymous with Dioclea.

Species list 
 Cymbosema apurense
 Cymbosema roseum

References 

Phaseoleae
Fabaceae genera